Mr. Kane, Pt. 2 is the fourth studio album by American rapper Kokane. It was released in 2004 on Ruthless Records. The record featured guest appearances from WC, Kurupt, Bad Azz, Roscoe, Suga Free, KM.G, Gangsta, Down, and Caviar.

Track listing

Note
Track 9 contains elements from traditional folk song "This Old Man"

Personnel
Jerry B. Long, Jr. – main artist
Down a.k.a. Kilo – featured artist (track 2)
Jamarr Antonio Stamps – featured artist (track 4)
David Brown – featured artist (tracks: 9, 12)
William Loshawn Calhoun, Jr. – featured artist (tracks: 11, 13)
Ricardo Brown – featured artist (track 12)
T. Anderson – featured artist (track 13)
Dejuan Walker – featured artist (track 14)
Kannon Cross – featured artist (tracks: 14-15)
Kevin Michael Gulley – featured artist (track 15)

References

2004 albums
Kokane albums